Münchner Theater für Kinder is a theatre located in Munich, Bavaria, Germany.

Theatres in Munich
Maxvorstadt